Pillsbury Baptist Bible College was an independent Baptist college in Owatonna, Minnesota, United States (1957–2008). Pillsbury described itself as a "biblical arts college." It offered a four-year program leading to the degrees of Bachelor of Arts in Bible and Bachelor of Science in Bible, as well as several associate degrees and a Bible certificate program.

The campus was previously home to the Pillsbury Military Academy, Pillsbury Academy, and Minnesota Academy.  In 1987 a historic district of five campus buildings was listed on the National Register of Historic Places as the Pillsbury Academy Campus Historic District.  It was nominated because of its local significance in architecture, education, and religion, because it was the only 19th-century Baptist institution of higher learning in Minnesota, and because of its association with benefactors Mark H. Dunnell and George A. Pillsbury.

History
The Minnesota Baptist State Convention opened the school as Minnesota Academy on September 10, 1877, as a college-preparatory school. The name was changed to Pillsbury Academy in 1886 in honor of one of its major donors, George A. Pillsbury, former mayor of Minneapolis and a member of the First Baptist Church of Minneapolis. In 1920 it was renamed the Pillsbury Military Academy. In 1957, after a dispute resulted in a change in Baptist Convention control from American Baptist to fundamentalist Minnesota Baptist, the Academy was abruptly closed and reconstituted as a 4-year biblical arts college, Pillsbury Baptist Bible College.

The older structures on campus were placed on the National Register of Historic Places on January 22, 1987, as the Pillsbury Academy Campus Historic District.  The five contributing properties are Old Main (built 1889), Music Hall (1892), Jefts Hall (1910–11), Lindsay Hall (1913–14), and a heating plant (1893).

In February 2005, Pillsbury received accreditation by the Association for Biblical Higher Education (ABHE). Pillsbury also had membership in the American Association of Christian Colleges and Seminaries.

Enrollment at the school had dropped from a high of about 800 in the years 1967-68 to 142 in its final semester.

Pillsbury announced in October 2008 that it would permanently close at the end of the year and that its campus would be sold. The college closed on December 31, 2008. Pillsbury's transcripts are now held by Maranatha Baptist University in perpetuity.

In April 2014, the campus was purchased and revamped as a summer camp called Camp Pillsbury, which opened in June 2014. In addition to the camp programs that will be offered, a technical charter school operated by the Technical Academies of Minnesota will be housed on campus.

Athletics
Athletic teams were called the Comets. The school had football, baseball, wrestling, cross country, soccer, and basketball for men and volleyball, cross country, softball, cheerleading, and basketball for women. Pillsbury Baptist Bible college was an NCAA division III institution. It was a member of the Upper Midwest Athletic Conference until 1988. They were the men's golf champions of their conference in 1995.

Alumni
 

Nathan Sproul (1994), Republican strategist and political consultant

See also
 National Register of Historic Places listings in Steele County, Minnesota

References

External links
 Pillsbury Baptist Bible College — Official from archive.org
 Pillsbury College Prep
 Camp Pillsbury

1957 establishments in Minnesota
2008 disestablishments in Minnesota
Association for Biblical Higher Education
Independent Baptist universities and colleges in the United States
Buildings and structures in Steele County, Minnesota
Defunct private universities and colleges in Minnesota
Education in Steele County, Minnesota
Educational institutions established in 1957
Educational institutions disestablished in 2008
Historic districts on the National Register of Historic Places in Minnesota
National Register of Historic Places in Steele County, Minnesota
University and college buildings on the National Register of Historic Places in Minnesota